Alive in America is a live album by the American rock group Steely Dan, released in 1995. It is Steely Dan's first live album.  The album comprises recordings from their 1993 and 1994 tours, which were the first live Steely Dan performances since 1974.

Critical reception 
Writing for The Village Voice in 1995, Carola Dibbell found the album "(naturally) excellent" but, having witnessed most of the featured performances in person, said it "sounded better truly live" while preferring the band's complete studio-album compilation Citizen Steely Dan (1993).

Track listing
All songs by Walter Becker and Donald Fagen, except where noted.

Personnel

 Walter Becker – guitar, lead vocals on "Book of Liars"
 Donald Fagen – lead vocals, melodica, electric piano
 Warren Bernhardt – piano
 Georg Wadenius – guitar
 Drew Zingg – guitar
 Tom Barney – bass guitar
 Cornelius Bumpus – tenor saxophone
 Chris Potter – alto saxophone, tenor saxophone
 Bob Sheppard – soprano saxophone, tenor saxophone
 Dennis Chambers – drums 
 Peter Erskine – drums 
 Catherine Russell – percussion, background vocals, human whistle
 Bill Ware – percussion, vibraphone
 Diane Garisto – background vocals
 Brenda White-King – background vocals

Production
Producer: Donald Fagen
Engineers: Phil Burnett, Roger Nichols
Directors: Warren Bernhardt, Drew Zingg
Morpheus Lights Technician: Bryce Heugel

Charts
Album

References

1995 live albums
Steely Dan live albums
Albums produced by Donald Fagen